Mitchell Patrick Browne (born 1 June 1966) is an Antigua and Barbuda sprinter. He competed in the men's 4 × 400 metres relay at the 1996 Summer Olympics.

References

External links
 

1966 births
Living people
Athletes (track and field) at the 1987 Pan American Games
Athletes (track and field) at the 1996 Summer Olympics
Antigua and Barbuda male sprinters
Olympic athletes of Antigua and Barbuda
Pan American Games competitors for Antigua and Barbuda
Place of birth missing (living people)